Pantheon and other Roleplaying Games is a 24-page book that includes five self-contained role-playing games for 3-6 players and designed to be completed in 1–2 hours.

History
Pantheon and Other Roleplaying Games (2000), by Robin Laws, was published by Hogshead Publishing as one of their New Style role-playing games.

System
Pantheon and Other Roleplaying Games consisted of five separate competitive storytelling role-playing games or scenarios, all with the same "Narrative Cage Match TM" system, in which players engage in storytelling rather than playing their characters. Each player tells one sentence of a story on their turn, and needs to mention their character every turn, while the other players have the opportunity to challenge this sentence with die-rolling and bidding using tokens. When all of the players run out of tokens, they finish the story and tally points on a score sheet.

Pantheon introduced a system called Narrative Cage Match (NCM) that differs from traditional role-playing game systems in that there is no referee or gamemaster. Players control a character that co-operates and competes with other characters to try to steer the course of the story so that their character finishes in a better position than all the others. Players influence the narrative outcomes of the games they are playing using a bidding mechanism that uses beads and traditional six-sided dice.

Games
Pantheon includes 5 games called:
Grave and Watery - Action and horror in an undersea base.
Boardroom Blitz - Players battle for control of a family megacorporation.
The Big Hole - Modern-day gangsters in a tale of crime, revenge and blackmail.
Destroy all Buildings - Giant monsters ravage Tokyo.
Pantheon - Create the universe.

New Style
Pantheon was one in a series of experimental/alternative role-playing games published by Hogshead Publishing. Other games in the series included the award-nominated The Extraordinary Adventures of Baron Münchhausen, Violence, and Puppetland/Powerkill.

Reviews
Pyramid

References

Sources
Review at RPG.net
Another Review at RPG.net
New Style Games

British role-playing games
New Style
Robin Laws games
Role-playing games introduced in 2000
Universal role-playing games